Råcksta is a district of Västerort, Stockholm, in Hässelby-Vällingby. It is next to the suburbs of Grimsta, Vällingby, Nälsta, Flysta, Beckomberga, Norra Ängby and Blackeberg. It had 4,484 inhabitants in 2005 and is 1.42 km2.

Districts in Västerort